Pachynematus extensicornis, the grass sawfly, is a species of common sawfly in the family Tenthredinidae.

References

Tenthredinidae
Articles created by Qbugbot